The Stanford Review (also known as The Review) is a student-run newspaper that serves Stanford University in Stanford, California. It was founded in 1987 by Peter Thiel and Norman Book.

History
In 1987, after around 500 students participated in a march led by Jesse Jackson's Rainbow Coalition, the students were inspired to put forth the Rainbow Agenda, a list of the concerns that the minority students wanted the institution to address. The Stanford Review was founded to provide an "alternative viewpoint" to what was expressed in the Agenda, by the "vocal few", as they were referred to in the publication's first issue, dated June 9, 1987, in an article titled "Stanford Review is here to stay". The founders felt that views being expressed were inconsistent with views held by majority of the student body. It aspired to be a place where "rational debate" could exist at the university.

In 1995, the paper prevailed in a free-speech lawsuit against the university's speech code. The court ruled that the code which banned insults that were racially and/or gender-motivated was unconstitutional. In a 2016 letter to the editor of The Stanford Daily, the managing editor wrote that "the entire purpose of The Review is to publish unpopular views". 
The letter also clarified that although the newspaper serves as an outlet for writers, whether they are a staff writer or otherwise, The Review itself may or may not have a position on the subject matter.

Incorporated in 1990 as nonprofit 501(c)3, a large portion of the publication's revenue is generated by fundraising efforts and alumni donors. While Thiel also makes financial contributions, he has hosted staff reunions at his home, and meets with the editors quarterly as a way to stay current with campus activities in general.

Notable former editors and staffs

Peter Thiel (founding editor-in-chief), co-founder of PayPal, Founders Fund, Palantir Technologies
Ken Howery (former managing editor), co-founder of PayPal, Founders Fund
David O. Sacks (former editor-in-chief), co-founder of Yammer, angel investor
Keith Rabois (former opinion editor), chief operating officer of Square, investor at Khosla Ventures
Stephen Cohen (former editor-in-chief), co-founder of Palantir Technologies
Joe Lonsdale (former editor-in-chief), co-founder of Palantir Technologies
Stephen Russell (former section editor), co-founder of Prism Skylabs
Eric Jackson (former editor-in-chief), chief executive officer of CapLinked
Gideon Yu (former business manager), co-owner and former president of the San Francisco 49ers, former chief financial officer of YouTube and Facebook
Ryan Bounds (former opinion editor), Assistant United States Attorney for the District of Oregon and failed nominee to the United States Court of Appeals for the Ninth Circuit
Tim Groseclose (former intramural sports editor), economist
Bruce Gibney (former editor-in-chief), former venture capitalist at Founders Fund, author
Fred Savage (former staffer), actor (The Wonder Years, The Grinder)
Candice Jackson (former news editor), Assistant Secretary of Education for Civil Rights under Secretary Betsy DeVos
Josh Hawley (former writer), United States Senator representing the state of Missouri.

Books written by former editors
Notable books written by its former editors include:
 The PayPal Wars by Eric M. Jackson
 Their Lives: The Women Targeted by the Clinton Machine by Candice E. Jackson
The Diversity Myth: Multiculturalism and the Politics of Intolerance at Stanford by Peter Thiel (co-authored David Sacks)
''Zero to One by Peter Thiel and Blake Masters

See also

 The Cornell Review
 The Dartmouth Review
 The Princeton Tory
 Collegiate Network
 The Fountain Hopper
 The Brown Spectator
 Berkeley Political Review
 Columbia Political Review
 Harvard Political Review
 Harvard Salient

References

External links
 The Stanford Review

Conservative magazines published in the United States
Libertarian publications
Magazines established in 1987
Magazines published in the San Francisco Bay Area
Review
Student magazines published in the United States